The Ukrainian Social Democratic Labour Party (Ukrayínsʹka sotsiál-demokratýchna robitnýcha pártiya), also known as  Esdeky and SDPists, was the leading party of the Ukrainian People's Republic. The party was reformed in 1905 at the Second Congress of the Revolutionary Ukrainian Party and was pursuing Marxism through the Social Democratic Party of Germany's Erfurt Program as well as national and cultural autonomy. Party leaders were Volodymyr Vynnychenko, Symon Petliura, Mykola Porsh, Dmytro Antonovych, Lev Yurkevych, Mykhailo Tkachenko, and Mykola Kovalsky.

The party identified its priority by resolving national matter and pushing its struggle for social liberalization of working class to the secondary set. In the spring of 1905, in his polemics with Dmytro Antonovych that was covered on pages of the party publishing Pratsia, Mykola Porsh argued his opinion about dependence of social and economic oppression from national. He insisted that for overcoming the social oppression foremost is necessary to solve the national issue. In Soviet propaganda, the party was identified as a petty bourgeoisie nationalistic party that was renamed as Ukrainian Social Democratic Labour Party to deceive people. Vladimir Lenin characterized the party as "representatives of the most low-grade, stupid and reactionary nationalism" who betray "interest not only democracy in general, but its own fatherland, Ukraine."

History 
With the ongoing Revolution of 1905 the party was reformed based on already existing Revolutionary Ukrainian Party (RUP) based from Kharkiv in December 1905 at the 2nd Party Congress of RUP. The party adopted the Erfurt Program of Social Democratic Party of Germany.

In December 1905, the Ukrainian Social-Democratic Labour Party (USLDP) decided to join the Russian Social Democratic Labour Party, provided it was recognised as the sole representative of the Ukrainian proletariat, within the RSDLP. The Fourth (Unity) Congress of the RSDLP rejected the proposal which the USDLP spokesman had made for the immediate discussion of the terms of a merger, and referred the matter to the Central Committee for decision. At the USDLP party congress in June 1907 the party adopted its resolution that was similar to ultimatum urging RSDLP to recognize Ukrainian autonomy, Ukrainian Social-Democracy must have its representative in the Central Committee of RSDLP, and accept USDLP as the RSDLP's national organization of Ukrainian proletariat. No agreement was reached on a merger. Arguably, the reason that there was no merger was the fact that the USLDP, the UPSR, and the URLDP all favoured an independent Ukrainian state.

After the USDLP party congress in March 1907 its activity were semi-active. The party also closely worked with the Jewish Bund subsequently including the Ukrainian Jewish into the government of Ukraine; as well as other menshevik factions which altogether accounted for around 3,000 members. In 1908 the USDLP was suspended and many of its activist went into exile, particularly to the Austrian Galicia (today Western Ukraine). In 1915 in Ukraine was revived the party's central committee bureau in place of its regular central committee. In 1914 just before the World War I, a group of USDLP activist who went into exile and led by Dmytro Dontsov and Volodymyr Doroshenko joined the Galician social democrats, national democrats and radical to form the Union for the Liberation of Ukraine. The "Union" declared its loyalty to the Central Powers (Austria-Hungary and German Empire) considering that they could help Ukraine to free from the Russian domination. Another group on contrary supported the Tsarist Russia. Such position was held by an editor of published in Moscow newspaper Ukrainskaya zhyzn (Ukrainian life) Symon Petlyura and his supporters. The rest of members took an anti-war internationalist position. Such position of proletarian internationalism had been held by the USDLP abroad organization publishing in Geneva, newspaper Borotba (Fight).

The party's activity was fully renewed in spring of 1917. After the February Revolution the party was the main party in the first Ukrainian government, the General Secretariat of Ukraine which was headed by the Volodymyr Vynnychenko (USLDP). Eventually it came into coalition with another party of Federalists (Ukrainian Party of Socialists-Federalists), the proponent of the federalism with the Russian Republic and was in the opposition to the other truly nationalistically oriented parties in the country such as the Democratic Agrarian Party, the Union of Land Owners, and others. With time SDeky lost its popularity in favor of the Ukrainian Socialist Revolutionary Party (SR) that worked together with the peasant representatives and gaining a rapid popularity amongst military formations within Ukraine. In 1918 together with several other Ukrainian parties formed the Ukrainian National Union that stayed in the opposition to the Hetmanate of Skoropadsky and later formed the Directory after defeat of the Hetman. After the IV Universal (Declaration of Independence) only two members of the party represented the party in the government (Dmytro Antonovych and Mykhailo Tkachenko).

During the Soviet times, the party was portrayed as nationalistic, as it was for the wide autonomy of the Ukrainian lands.

Party's splits 

There were at least two splits of the party.

The first split occurred soon after revival of the party and invasion of the Russian revolutionary forces in December 1917 when its few left Ukrainian Social Democrats (LUSD) officially left the party and joined the Russian revolutionary forces. Among the notable members of LUSD was Yevhen Neronovych. Some members later became constituent members of the Communist Party of Ukraine.

At the Fourth party Congress on January 10–12, 1919 the party had several members split again as nezalezhni (independent). Among the most prominent independists were Anatol Pisotsky, Vasyl and Yuriy Mazurenkos, Mykhailo Tkachenko, and others. They recognized the necessity of the dictatorship of proletariat and peace with Russia. The main faction consisting of Mykola Porsh, Volodymyr Vynnychenko, Symon Petliura, Isaak Mazepa, and most of the party members opposed their ideas and were proposing the Labor Democracy, phased socialization of the main industries of People's Economy, and support of Direktoria.

Later in 1920 those independent SDPists formed the Ukrainian Communist Party also known as UKPists as opposed to the Communist Party (Bolsheviks) of Ukraine. The independent SDPists, or Socialists-Sovereigns, were opposing the centrist tendency of the Moscow Communists parties, particularly the Bolsheviks. The Ukrainian Communist Party became a legal party of the Soviet Union.

In exile 

As the government of Ukraine was emigrating into exile during the Russian-Ukrainian war of 1918–1919, a section of the USDLP was formed as the 'Foreign Delegation' of the party. During 1919 the party's Central Committee included Yosyp Bezpalko, Andriy Livytsky, Mykola Shadlun, and I. Romanchenko. At the party's conference September 9–13, 1919 in Vienna the Central Committee requested for its party members to withdraw out of the government. USDLP had members in Czechoslovakia, Poland, Germany and France, amongst other countries with the center in Prague. Isaak Mazepa was the secretary of the Foreign Delegation while other members of the Foreign Delegation included Yo. Bezpalko, Fedenko, I. Romanchenko, amongst others. The party began issuing publications: Socijalistyčna Dumko (published in Lviv and Prague), Vil'na Ukraina (Lviv) and Socijaldemokrat (published monthly from 1925 from Poděbrady). The party was a member of the Labour and Socialist International between 1923 and 1940.

As of the early 1960s, Emil Wolynec was the acting chairman of the party, Panas Fedenko the general secretary and Bohdan Fedenko the youth secretary. Other executive committee members of the party were Antin Czerneckyj, Iwan Luczyszyn and Spyrydon Dovhal. The party had its headquarters in London. It published the monthly Nashe Slovo from London with Panas Fedenko as its editor. The party also issued the quarterly Vilna Ukraina from Detroit, with Mykola Nahirniak as its editor and Volodymyr Lysyj as its director. Vilna Ukraina and Nashe Slovo each had a circulation of around 1,000. Furthermore, there was a weekly newspaper (Narodna Volya) published from Scranton which was politically close to the party.

Party official assemblies 
 1st Congress in 1905 was also the 3rd Congress of the Revolutionary Ukrainian Party.
 2nd Congress on April 17–18, 1917 was also known as the reviving congress.
 3rd Congress
 4th Congress on January 12–14, 1919 (Kyiv) split into two factions: "official social-democracy" and "independent social-democracy"
 Conference on September 9, 1919 (Vienna)

Party press media 
 Slovo weekly, 1907–1909 in Kyiv.
 Pratsia, newspaper
 Robitnyk, newspaper, from June 1917 in Kharkiv (three times a week) and 1919–1923 irregularly in Chernivtsi
 Nash Holos, newspaper in Lviv
 Robitnycha Hazeta, a party diary

See also 

 Revolutionary Ukrainian Party
 General Secretariat of Ukraine
 Ukrainian Communist Party

References

External links
Lenin: 1906/rucong: The Composition of the Congress
Ukrainian Social Democratic Labour Party at the Encyclopedia of Ukraine

1905 establishments in the Russian Empire
1950s disestablishments in Ukraine
Defunct social democratic parties in Ukraine
Labour parties in Ukraine
Members of the Labour and Socialist International
Political parties disestablished in 1950
Political parties established in 1905
Social democratic parties in the Soviet Union
Soviet opposition groups
Ukrainian political parties in Imperial Russia